İşler Güçler is a Turkish comedy drama series which aired first on 28 June 2012 on Star TV and tells the story of three actors, with the motto Modern Muzip Yalanlar (modern wicked lies). The main actors are Ahmet Kural, Murat Cemcir and Sadi Celil Cengiz who are using their real names in the TV series.

Topic

Ahmet Kural, Murat Cemcir and Sadi Celil Cengiz are dreaming to shoot a movie together. They can't however provide the money needed for it and start working on smaller projects like 'Meslek Hikayeleri' (profession stories) in order to afford it.

Ahmet, misses the days he played a leading role in a TV series. He thinks that he is not a well-known actor currently and is always complaining about this situation.

Murat is trying to do his best and also finds it difficult to work with his ex-girlfriend who left him several years ago.

Sadi, had given up working as a customs official before joining the cast of 'Meslek Hikayeleri'. He has to deal with some financial and family problems. Getting his wage is really important for him because he does not have a money source except the series in which he acts as a figurant. However, the crew and the producer of the documentary makes it more difficult.

Characters

References

External links 
tvyo'da İşler Güçler
Star TV'de İşler Güçler
{{Twitter

2012 Turkish television series debuts
Turkish comedy television series
Star TV (Turkey) original programming
Television shows set in Istanbul
Television series produced in Istanbul
Television series set in the 2010s
Turkish television series endings